Express Packet (or Express) was built in France in 1807, probably under another name, and taken in prize circa 1808. From 1809 she sailed as a packet for the Post Office Packet Service out of Falmouth, Cornwall. In 1812 an American privateer captured here in a notable single ship action, but then returned her to her captain and crew after plundering her. Express stopped sailing as a packet in 1817 and then made one more voyage to Spain, after which she disappeared from online records.

Career
Captain John Bullock assumed command of Express Packet on 3 December 1808, and she started sailing for the packet service in 1809.
Two French privateers captured Jacob, of Philadelphia, Jellig, master, as she was sailing from Cadiz and Gibraltar. On 30 June 1810 Express Packet recaptured Jacob and carried her into Gibraltar.

On 23 March 1811 ths of Express Packet were offered for sale. Four days earlier, she had arrived at Falmouth from Jamaica with 560,000 dollars.

Captain John Watkins assumed command of Express Packet on 4 February 1812.

Captain John Quick assumed command of Express Packet on 31 December 1812.

On 23 March 1813, Express Packet, John Quick, master, left Rio de Janeiro, bound for Falmouth. She ha a crew of 32 men and boys. Anaconda was armed with 18 guns and had a crew of 120 men. The ensuing action lasted for an hour and a half before Captain Quick felt he had to strike. Although Express Packet had suffered no casualties but four guns had been dismounted, her rigging was cut to pieces, and holes between wind and water had resulted in her having taken on 3½ feet of water with more coming in. The Americans plundered express Packet of all her stores and threw her guns overboard. They also took out £10,000 or £12,000 in gold bullion. The Americans restored the passengers' private property and gave Express Packet back to Quick and his crew.

Express Packet arrived back at Falmouth on 19 May 1813. She had sunk her mails before she was captured. The Captains' Enquiry into the action praised Captain Quick for his conduct. The damage to Express reduced her valuation from £3071 to £2270 12s. Quick received th of that as salvage. The repairs took over two months to complete and cost £2341 14s 9d.

Express Packet then returned to normal service.

Fate
Express Packet was no longer listed among the "Falmouth Packets" in the LR volume for 1818. She was listed as Express among the regular merechant vessels, still with Quick as master and trade Falmouth. The last mention of Express, Quick, master in Lloyd's Lists ship arrival and departure data showed her arriving in Corunna on 4 October 1817 from Falmouth.

Notes, citations, and references
Notes

Citations

References
 
 

1807 ships
Captured ships
Age of Sail merchant ships of England
Falmouth Packets